Ramah was a small mission run by the Moravian Church in northern Labrador from 1871 until 1908. It was located on Ramah Bay.

Ramah Chert 
Ramah Bay is the site of an uncommon semi-translucent light-grey stone with dark banding called "Ramah chert". The Ramah chert outcrops in a narrow geological bed stretching from Saglek Fiord to Nachvak. At Ramah Bay the highest quality stone, for flaking chipped stone tools (mostly bifaces and projectile points), is most readily accessible. Discovered by pioneering Native American groups, which archaeologists identify as the Maritime Archaic Culture, around 7000 years ago, the stone was highly valued for its functional as well as spiritual qualities.  Ramah chert was the preferred raw material for the Maritime Archaic Indians (ca. 7000 to 3500 years ago) and for succeeding populations of Dorset paleoeskimos (ca. 2200 to 800 years ago) and by the immediate ancestors of the Innu (from about 2000 years ago to contact with the Europeans in the 18th century). Ramahchert was traded as far south as New England and even Chesapeake Bay and west to the Great Lakes which is documented in a report by Stephen Loring.

See also
List of communities in Newfoundland and Labrador

References 

 2002 ’And they took away the stones from Ramah’: lithic raw material sourcing and Eastern Arctic archaeology. In, Honoring Our Elders: A History of Eastern Arctic Archaeology., edited by William Fitzhugh, Stephen Loring and Daniel Odess, Contributions to Circumpolar Anthropology, volume 2. Arctic Studies Center, Smithsonian Institution, Washington, D.C., pp. 163–185.

External links 
 The Moravian Church
 Ancient Uses of Ramah Chert
  World:Canada:Province of Newfoundland and Labrador Maps and Meteorological Data for Ramah

History of the Labrador Province of the Moravian Church
Ghost towns in Newfoundland and Labrador